Saheed Nagar WNS or Sahid Nagar is a neighbourhood and major commercial area in Bhubaneswar, Odisha. Originally planned as an upscale residential area, Saheed Nagar is now primarily known as a high-street commercial area along Janpath. Saheed Nagar is one of the best developed posh locality of Bhubaneswar. This is the 10th Unit of Bhubaneswar after all nine units originally planned when the new Bhubaneswar Town / city was planned in the year 1950.

Saheed Nagar was designed and planned by the General Administration Department of Government of Odisha around 1960 and majority of the plots herein were private plots. Saheed Nagar starts immediately after Satya Nagar and stretched up to national Highway 5 I.e. Vani Vihar Chhak. Saheed Nagar is located not less than a square kilometer. It has a local Railway station named Vani Vihar Railway Station. It adjoins Rasulgarh and Mancheswar Industrial Area. The next huge campus to Saheed Nagar is Utkal University Campus. It is located between East Coast Railway Line in East, Janpath on West, National High way in North and Satya Nagar in South. It has got different size of plots starting from one acre till 1/10th of an acre. Even plot size less than 4800 sq. feet are available in A numbered plots adjacent to Railway lines. Approximately there are 1500 plots of different size are available here. Plot Nos. 1 to 800 are the original plots. Later A, B and C plots of smaller size were carved out from left over railway line areas and other areas nearby Highway and Janpath. There is also a Market Building complex which is a resident cum shop type apartments. Besides the above and there was a traditional vegetable market which was later on developed to a market complex called Bhavani mall wherein now one Cine Multiplex is also available. Apart from the Saheed Nagar market building, there is another market complex named Surya Kiran Market Complex. A good hotel named Triumph Residency, A good office complex called Alok Bharti Tower. There are as many as fifty parks of about one acre each are available in Saheed Nagar. The plots on the right side of Maharahi college marg are the unauthorised or non developed lands which were not properly numbered. Originally these were the submerged canal / catchment areas of the canal that divides Saheed Nagar and Satya Nagar. The great shanti palli slum areas of Saheed Nagar lies in these areas too.

Saheed Nagar Durga Puja Committee had started the traditional Ravan Podi in 1980s which was unique and first time to celebrate in the state of Odisha. Saheed Nagar Durga Puja committee ground is a huge ground wherein lakhs of people in Bhubaneswar celebrate Dussera.

Saheed Nagar have got one named famed college called Maharthi College. The first Ramadevi women's University of Odisha, University Law College, Incometax, VAT, GST, DCP Bhubaneswar, IDCO, IPICOL, PF, ELECTION COMMISSION and many more important offices adjoins Saheed Nagar. Saheed Nagar Dispensary, High School are some of the important locations. Prestigious Law Office of Varma & Varma, Law Firm handling cases for Central Government as Senior Counsel, Special Public Prosecutor for Central Bureau of Investigation, Senior Counsel for State of Uttar Pradesh, Standing Counsel for South Delhi Municipal Corporation in Delhi High Court, National Green Tribunal is also situated in Saheed Nagar, Bhubaneswar.

Saheed Nagar is also quite famous for fast food centres near Ramadevi Women's University more particularly for rolls, chats, golgappas, dahibara aludam, lingaraj lassi. Sahid Nagar also have the outlet for Salepur Bikalananda Kara's sweet shop. Mukharuchi namkeen the famous namkeen outlet have its original outlet from here.

Sahid Nagar also have a Computer Hardware and other related dedicated outlets in Meghdoot Hotel lane.

Landmarks
 Academy of Advanced Media & Communication Center, India - AAMCC.IN
Pantaloons
Five Star Enterprises 
Rama Devi Women's University
 Basudev Wood-The Premium Furniture Store
 Institute of Digital Media Technology, India - IDMT.IN
 Reliance Trends
 IDCO Tower
 Maharshi College of Natural Law
 Rice Bowl
 Dawat
 Durga Mandap
 Lingaraj Lassi Center
 Bhawani BMC Mall
 Inox
 Aangan
 Sprash hospital
 Ram Mandir
 Mobile shops
 Subham Digicare IT Centre 
 Swain Enterprises ARROW/IZOD
 Varma & Varma Law Firm, Central Government Counsel
 DASH Pathology & Diagnostics
 Keshari Solutions (electronice security service
 [Esplanade One]
 Vanik Coaching centre for Bank Ssc

References

Neighbourhoods in Bhubaneswar
Retail markets in India